A column is a vertical structural element in architecture.

Column or columns may also refer to:

Art and entertainment
 Column (periodical), a recurring piece or article in a newspaper or magazine
 "Columns" (How I Met Your Mother), a 2007 episode of How I Met Your Mother
 Columns (video game), a puzzle video game

Computing, informatics and mathematics
 Column (data store), a NoSQL object
 Column (database), a set of data values of a particular type in a relational database
 Column(s) in a table (information), a data arrangement with rows and columns
 Column vector, an m × 1 matrix in linear algebra
 Miller Columns, the data tree structure visualization technique

Military
 Column (formation), a military formation
 Flying column, a combined arms independent military formation of a temporary nature

Science
 Column (botany) or gynostemium, a part of an orchid
 Column chromatography, a method used to purify individual chemical compounds from mixtures of compounds
 Column-based nucleic acid purification
 Cortical column, a group of neurons in the brain cortex
 Fractionating column, an essential item used in distillation of liquid mixtures
 Packed bed column, an apparatus used in column chromatography, absorption, scrubbing and distillation
 Stalagnate (or pillar or sinter column), a limestone cave formation comprising a column from the ceiling to the floor
 Vertebral column, a column of vertebrae situated in the dorsal aspect of the abdomen
 Column (fluid dynamics), a vertical body of one fluid moving through another
 Eruption column, a cloud of super-heated material suspended in gases after a volcanic eruption

Other uses
 Columns (juggling), a juggling pattern
 Column (typography), a vertical block of text positioned on a page
 Fifth Column, group of people who undermine a larger group, city or nation

See also 
 Collum (disambiguation), a neck or neck-like structure, also a surname
 Columnar (disambiguation)
 Column groups and row groups
 Help:Columns
 Template:Column
 Template:Columns-list